Sikiana, or Kashuyana (also called Chikena, Chiquena, Chiquiana, Shikiana, Sikiâna, Sikïiyana, Xikiyana, Xikujana) is a Carib language that was spoken by 33 people in Brazil and 15 people in Suriname.  It was spoken in Venezuela at one time and is now probably extinct there. The Warikyana dialect became extinct around 2000, and the language frequently goes by the name of the surviving dialect, Sikiana.

References

Languages of Brazil
Languages of Suriname
Languages of Venezuela
Cariban languages